Keiji Ohbiki (Japanese:大引 啓次, born June 29, 1984) is a Japanese professional baseball shortstop who is a free agent. He previously played for the Orix Buffaloes, Hokkaido Nippon-Ham Fighters and Tokyo Yakult Swallows of the Nippon Professional Baseball (NPB).

On December 2, 2019, he become free agent.

References

External links

1984 births
Living people
Hokkaido Nippon-Ham Fighters players
Hosei University alumni
Japanese baseball players
Nippon Professional Baseball infielders
Orix Buffaloes players
Baseball people from Osaka
Tokyo Yakult Swallows players